The 2016 European Canoe Slalom Championships took place in Liptovský Mikuláš, Slovakia under the auspices of the European Canoe Association (ECA). It was the 17th edition of the competition and Liptovský Mikuláš hosted the event for the second time after previously hosting it in 2007. The events took place at the Ondrej Cibak Whitewater Slalom Course from 12 to 15 May 2016.

This event also served as the European qualification for the 2016 Summer Olympics in Rio de Janeiro.

Medal summary

Men's results

Canoe

Kayak

Women's results

Canoe

Kayak

Medal table

References

External links

 European Canoe Association

European Canoe Slalom Championships
European Canoe Slalom Championships
Canoeing and kayaking competitions in Slovakia
2016 in Slovak sport
Sport in Žilina Region